The Arboretum de Neuville-de-Poitou is a municipal arboretum located in Neuville-de-Poitou, Vienne, Poitou-Charentes, France. The arboretum was created along a former railway track, and now displays 380 types of trees and shrubs planted along a 3-kilometer walking path. It is open daily without charge.

See also 
 List of botanical gardens in France

References 
 Jardinez description (French)
 Tourisme Vienne description (French)
 Bois Forest description (French)

Neuville-de-Poitou, Arboretum de
Neuville-de-Poitou, Arboretum de